Blood and soil is a nationalist slogan expressing Nazi Germany's ideal of a racially defined national body ("blood") united with a settlement area ("soil"). By it, rural and farm life forms are idealized as a counterweight to urban ones. It is tied to the contemporaneous German concept of Lebensraum, the belief that the German people were to expand into Eastern Europe, conquering and displacing the native Slavic and Baltic population via Generalplan Ost. 

"Blood and soil" was a key slogan of Nazi ideology. The nationalist ideology of the Artaman League and the writings of Richard Walther Darré guided agricultural policies which were later adopted by Adolf Hitler, Heinrich Himmler and Baldur von Schirach.

Rise
The German expression was coined in the late 19th century, in tracts espousing racialism/racism and romantic nationalism. It produced a regionalist literature, with some social criticism. This romantic attachment was widespread prior to the rise of the Nazis. Major figures in 19th century German agrarian romanticism included Ernst Moritz Arndt and Wilhelm Heinrich Riehl, who argued that the peasantry represented the foundation of the German people and conservatism.

Ultranationalists predating the Nazis often supported country living as more healthy, with the Artaman League sending urban children to the countryside to work in part in hopes of transforming them into Wehrbauern (lit. "soldier peasants").

Richard Walther Darré popularized the phrase at the time of the rise of Nazi Germany in his 1930 book  (A New Nobility Based On Blood And Soil), in which he proposed a systematic eugenics program, arguing for selective breeding as a cure-all for the problems plaguing the state. In 1928, he had also written the book, Peasantry as the Life Source of the Nordic Race, in which he presented his theory that the alleged difference between Nordic people and Southeastern Europeans was based in the Nordic people's connection to superior land. Darré was an influential member of the Nazi Party and a noted race theorist who assisted the party greatly in gaining support among common Germans outside the cities. Prior to their ascension to power, Nazis called for a return from the cities to the countryside. This agrarian sentiment allowed opposition to both the middle class and the aristocracy, and presented the farmer as a superior figure beside the moral swamp of the city.

Nazi ideology

The doctrine not only called for a "back to the land" approach and re-adoption of "rural values"; it held that German land was bound, perhaps mystically, to German blood. Peasants were the Nazi cultural heroes, who held charge of German racial stock and German history—as when a memorial of a medieval peasant uprising was the occasion for a speech by Darré praising them as a force and purifier of German history. Agrarianism was asserted as the only way to truly understand the "natural order." Urban culture was decried as a weakness, labelled "asphalt culture" and partially coded as resulting from Jewish influence, and was depicted as a weakness that only the Führer's will could eliminate.

The doctrine also contributed to the Nazi ideal of a woman: a sturdy peasant, who worked the land and bore strong children, contributing to praise for athletic women tanned by outdoor work. That country women gave birth to more children than city ones was also a factor in the support.

 displayed anti-Semitic demographic charts to deplore the alleged destruction of Aryan families' farmland and claim that the Jews were eradicating traditional German peasantry. Posters for schools depicted the flight of people from the countryside to the city. The German National Catechism, German propaganda widely used in schools, also spun tales of how farmers supposedly lost ancestral lands and had to move to the city, with all its demoralizing effects.

Nazi implementation
The program received far more ideological and propaganda support than concrete changes. When Gottfried Feder tried to settle workers in villages about decentralized factories, generals and Junkers successfully opposed him. Generals objected because it interfered with rearmament, and Junkers because it would prevent their exploiting their estates for the international market. It would also require the breakup of Junker estates for independent farmers, which was not implemented.

The , the State Hereditary Farm Law of 1933, implemented this ideology, stating that its aim was to: "preserve the farming community as the blood-source of the German people". Selected lands were declared hereditary and could not be mortgaged or alienated, and only these farmers were entitled to call themselves  or "farmer peasant", a term the Nazis attempted to refurbish from a neutral or even pejorative to a positive term. Regional custom was only allowed to decide whether the eldest or the youngest son was to be the heir. In areas where no particular custom prevailed, the youngest son was to be the heir. During the Nazi era, the eldest son inherited the farm in most cases. Priority was given to the patriline, so that, if there were no sons, the brothers and brothers' sons of the deceased peasant had precedence over the peasant's own daughters. The countryside was also regarded as the best place to raise infantry, and as having an organic harmony between landowner and peasant, unlike the "race chaos" of the industrial cities. It also prevented Jewish people from farming: "Only those of German blood may be farmers."

The concept was a factor in the requirement of a year of land service for members of Hitler Youth and the League of German Girls. This period of compulsory service was required after completion of a student's basic education, before they could engage in advanced studies or become employed. Although working on a farm was not the only approved form of service, it was a common one; the aim was to bring young people back from the cities, in the hope that they would then stay "on the land". In 1942, 600,000 boys and 1.4 million girls were sent to help bring in the harvest.

Lebensraum

Blood and soil was one of the foundations of the concept of Lebensraum, "living space". By expanding eastward and transforming those lands into breadbaskets, another blockade, such as that of World War I, would not cause massive food shortages, as that one had, a factor that aided the resonance of "Blood and soil" for the German population. Even Alfred Rosenberg, not hostile to the Slavs as such, regarded their removal from this land, where Germans had once lived, as necessary because of the unity of blood and soil.  prescribed as the unvarying aim of foreign policy the necessity of obtaining land and soil for the German people (again, "German people" defined by the Nazi Party as racially pure).

While discussing the question of Lebensraum to the east, Hitler envisioned a Ukrainian "breadbasket" and expressed particular hostility to its "Russian" cities as hotbeds of Russianness and Communism, forbidding Germans to live in them and declaring that they should be destroyed in the war. Even during the war itself, Hitler gave orders that Leningrad was to be razed with no consideration given for the survival and feeding of its population. This also called for industry to die off in these regions. The Wehrbauer, or soldier-peasants, who were to settle there were not to marry townswomen, but only peasant women who had not lived in towns. This would also encourage large families.

Furthermore, this land, held by "tough peasant races", would serve as a bulwark against attack from Asia.

Influence on art

Fiction
This literature was vastly increased, the term being contracted into "Blu-Bo", and developed a mysticism of unity. It also combined war literature with the figure of the soldier-peasant, uncontaminated by the city. These books were generally set in the nominal past, but their invocation of the passing of the seasons often gave them an air of timelessness. "Blood and soil" novels and theater celebrated the farmer's life and their fertility, often mystically linking them.

One of the anti-Semitic fabrications in the children's book  was the claim that the Talmud described farming as the most lowly of occupations. It also included an account of a Jewish financier forcing a German to sell his farm as seen by a neighbor boy; deeply distressed, the boy resolved never to let a Jew into his house, for which his father praised him, on the grounds that peasants must remember that Jews will always take their land.

Fine art
During the Nazi period in Germany, one of the charges put forward against certain works of art was that "Art must not be isolated from blood and soil." Failure to meet this standard resulted in the attachment of the label "degenerate art" to offending pieces. In art of Nazi Germany, both landscape paintings and figures reflected blood-and-soil ideology. Indeed, some Nazi art exhibits were explicitly titled "Blood and Soil". Artists frequently gave otherwise apolitical paintings such titles as "German Land" or "German Oak". Rural themes were heavily favored in painting. Landscape paintings were featured most heavily in the Greater German Art Exhibitions. While drawing on German Romantic traditions, painted landscapes were expected to be firmly based on real landscapes, the German people's , without religious overtones. Peasants were also popular images, promoting a simple life in harmony with nature. This art showed no sign of the mechanization of farm work. The farmer labored by hand, with effort and struggle.

The acceptance of this art by the peasant family was also regarded as an important element.

Film
Under Richard Walther Darré, The Staff Office of Agriculture produced the short propaganda film , which was displayed at Nazi party meetings as well as in public cinemas throughout Germany. Other  films likewise stressed the commonality of Germanness and the countryside.  has the heroine running away to the city, resulting in her pregnancy and abandonment; she drowns herself, and her last words beg her father to forgive her for not loving the countryside as he did. The film  (The Eternal Forest) depicted the forest as being beyond the vicissitudes of history, and the German people the same because they were rooted in the story; it depicted the forest sheltering ancient Aryan Germans, Arminius, and the Teutonic Knights, facing the peasants wars, being chopped up by war and industry, and being humiliated by occupation with black soldiers, but culminated in a neo-pagan May Day celebration. In The Journey to Tilsit, the Polish seductress is portrayed as an obvious product of debased "asphalt culture" (urbanity) but the virtuous German wife is a country-dweller in traditional costume. Many other commercial films of the Nazi era featured gratuitous, lingering shots of the German landscape and idealized 'Aryan' couples.

Japanese usage
An Investigation of Global Policy with the Yamato Race as Nucleus made extensive use of the term, usually in quotation marks, and showing an extensive debt to the Nazi usage.

Modern use
North American white supremacists, white nationalists, Neo-Nazis and members of the alt-right have adopted the slogan. It gained widespread public prominence as a result of the August 2017 Unite the Right rally in Charlottesville, Virginia, when participants carrying torches marched on the University of Virginia campus on the night of 11 August 2017 and were recorded chanting the slogan, among others. The rally was organized to protest the town's planned removal of a statue of Robert E. Lee. The rally remained in national news through December 2018 thanks to the trial of James Alex Fields, a white supremacist who purposefully ran his car into a crowd of counter-protestors, killing 32-year old paralegal Heather Heyer. The chant was also heard in October 2017 at the "White Lives Matter" rally in Shelbyville, Tennessee.

In his 2018 farewell letter, US Senator John McCain stated that America is "a nation of ideals, not blood and soil", specifically rejecting such notions.

See also
 Bumiputera (Malaysia)
 Ethnic nationalism
 Zionism
 Korean ethnic nationalism
 Irredentism
 Jus soli 
 Jus sanguinis 
 Nativism (politics)
 Race (human categorization)
 Reichsnährstand
 Völkisch movement

References

Bibliography

Further reading

External links

 The Doctrine of Blut und Boden
 Fascist Ecology: The "Green Wing" of the Nazi Party and its Historical Antecedents
 Blood and Soil (Harpers) (subscription required)

Nazi terminology
Agrarian politics
Society of Nazi Germany
Political catchphrases